The Mica Bay Incident (also known as the Michipicoten War or the Mica Bay Uprising) was a land and resources dispute in along the shore of Lake Superior in November 1849. It is partially responsible for the signing of the 1850 Robinson-Huron Treaty.

Background
The political tensions leading up to the incident reflect ongoing Indigenous concerns around land rights, mineral extraction, and corporate/crown encroachment on traditional territories.

Incident
In 1849 a group of First Nations and Métis people were displeased with ongoing mineral extraction by local mining companies. This mining was occurring outside of a negotiated treaty and contrary to the 1763 Royal Proclamation's statements on Indigenous land and resource rights. In November 1849 a group  traveled from Sault Ste. Marie, Ontario to Mica Bay on the shore of Lake Superior.  Upon arrival at Mica Bay the group attacked copper mining sites established by the Quebec Mining Company, with the goal of forcing the Company off the land. Over 100 soldiers were sent to put down the incident and in December a number of the leaders were arrested and detained in Toronto.

Leaders of the incident included Chief Shingawukonse (Garden River First Nation), Chief Nebenaigoching (Batchewana First Nation), Chief Oshawana, Allan Macdonell, Metcalfe, and others.

Aftermath

The Mica Bay incident is known as the tipping point which forced the government to negotiate treaty agreements with Indigenous communities in the Lake Huron and Lake Superior region. The Mica Bay Incident occurred shortly before the signing of the Robinson Treaties.

See also
 1849 in Canada

References

Further reading

 

Indigenous conflicts in Canada
Land rights movements
Protests in Canada
Aboriginal title in Canada
History of Algoma District
1849 in Ontario